Kristin Elisabeth Linde Gjelsvik (born 22 August 1986) is a Norwegian blogger and YouTuber.

Born and raised in Bergen, Gjelsvik became   well-known throughout Norway in 2012 when she participated in Paradise Hotel. After that, she continued in the spotlight as an influencer and founded a clothing brand which would later go bankrupt.

Gjelsvik later went on to participate in more reality shows, such as Robinsonekspedisjonen, Bloggerne, and Camp Kulinaris. She has also issued the book #branok.

As an influencer, Gjelsvik is known, among other things, for her staunch opposition to plastic surgery.

While filming Paradise Hotel in 2012, Gjelsvik began dating Dennis Poppe Thorsen, a fellow social media influencer. The couple married in 2015, and they currently reside in the Grünerløkka borough of Oslo with their son Falk, who was born in 2019.

References

1986 births
Living people
Mass media people from Bergen
Norwegian bloggers
Norwegian women bloggers
21st-century Norwegian women writers
Participants in Norwegian reality television series